The Division of Richmond is an Australian electoral division in the state of New South Wales.

History

The division was proclaimed in 1900, and was one of the original 65 divisions to be contested at the first federal election. The division is named after the area in which it is located, namely the Richmond Valley and Richmond River, which was named in honour of Charles, the fifth Duke of Richmond.

Historically, the division has been a rural seat and fairly safe for the National Party (formerly called the Country Party), which held it for all but six years from 1922 to 2004. For 55 of those years, it was held by three generations of the Anthony family—Hubert Lawrence Anthony (a minister in the Fadden and Menzies governments), Doug Anthony (leader of the National Party from 1971 to 1984 and Deputy Prime Minister in the Gorton, McMahon and Fraser governments) and Larry Anthony (a minister in the Howard government)—the first three-generation dynasty in the Australian House of Representatives. However, it became far less safe for the Nationals from 1983 onward, and strong population growth over the last three decades has seen it progressively lose its rural territory and reduced it to a more coastal-based and urbanised division. Accompanying demographic change has made the seat friendlier to Labor since the 1990s.

The division's most notable member outside of the Anthony family was Charles Blunt, leader of the National Party from 1989 to 1990. His tenure was short-lived, however. Just months after becoming leader of the Nationals, he was defeated in the 1990 election when the preferences of anti-nuclear activist Helen Caldicott allowed Neville Newell to claim the seat for Labor for the first time ever, despite only winning 27 percent of first preferences. It was only the second time that a major party leader had lost his own seat in an election. Larry Anthony (junior) regained the seat for the Nationals in 1996, only to be defeated by Labor's Justine Elliot in 2004—the first time a member of the Anthony family had been unseated in an election. In 2007, Elliot picked up a large swing as Labor won government, technically making Richmond a safe Labor seat. She retained the seat at the 2010, 2013 and 2016 elections. The victory in 2013 came even as Labor lost government, marking the second time (her 2004 victory being the first) that the non-Labor parties have been in government without holding Richmond.
Also shortly after Elliot's reelection in 2010, it marked the longest time the Labor Party has held the seat.

Richmond had the sixth highest vote for the Australian Greens, and saw the highest rural seat vote for the Greens in the nation. A redistribution ahead of the 2016 election pushed the seat to the south, into the area around Ballina. Much of this area is in the state seat of Ballina, which was taken by the Greens at the 2015 state election. At the most recent election in 2019, the Greens won more booths on primary vote than Labor (Greens 20, Labor 9), although Labor won more total votes when including all booths.

Boundaries
Since 1984, federal electoral division boundaries in Australia have been determined at redistributions by a redistribution committee appointed by the Australian Electoral Commission. Redistributions occur for the boundaries of divisions in a particular state, and they occur every seven years, or sooner if a state's representation entitlement changes or when divisions of a state are malapportioned.

The division is located in the far north-east of the state, adjacent to the Coral Sea. It adjoins the Queensland border to the north, and encompasses the towns of Ballina, Tweed Heads, Murwillumbah and Byron Bay.

Members

Election results

References

External links
 Division of Richmond - Australian Electoral Commission

Electoral divisions of Australia
Constituencies established in 1901
1901 establishments in Australia